"Wastin' Whiskey" is a song recorded by Canadian country group James Barker Band. The group's frontman James Barker wrote the song with Jared Keim and Travis Wood, while Todd Clark produced the track.

Background
The band previewed "Wastin' Whiskey" on multiple social media platforms including Twitter and TikTok prior to its release. They also promoted the release of the track with a video titled "Wastin' Whiskey Roulette" where each of the band members took sips of unknown liquids out of shot glasses. The song is part of a large crop of new music the band intends to release as a potential album including "Over All Over Again" and "New Old Trucks". James Barker cited the song as the group's first "fan-driven" single, as the initial clip of the song that the band posted to TikTok quickly received over one million views in under a month, prompting the band to choose it as their next release to radio. He said that the song "came together in just a few hours – everything from the lyrics to production" and that most of the original vocals are the ones on the final version of the track.

Critical reception
Nanci Dagg of Canadian Beats Media stated that the song "takes listeners back to the all-too-relatable agony of not being able to get over a broken heart, regardless of how many drinks you down," noting "heartbreak-fuelled electric guitar licks and Barker's smooth vocals". Lauren Lee of Front Porch Music favourably reviewed the track, saying that the band "perfectly [captures] that oh-so-relatable feeling of desperation that comes with the end of a relationship – the inability to move on, no matter how deeply you try to drown your sorrows".

Commercial performance
"Wastin' Whiskey" reached a peak of number two on the Billboard Canada Country chart for the week of August 27, 2022, marking the band's tenth top ten hit. It also reached a peak of number 67 on the Canadian Hot 100 for the same week. It has been certified Gold by Music Canada.

Charts

Certifications

References

2022 songs
2022 singles
James Barker Band songs
Songs written by James Barker (singer)
Songs written by Travis Wood (songwriter)
Song recordings produced by Todd Clark
Songs about alcohol